"We Can Make It!" is the nineteenth single by Japanese boy band Arashi. The single was released on May 2, 2007 through J Storm. It was included in the band's seventh studio album Time (2007). "We Can Make It" is a cover of "Love Is All Around" by Swedish singer Agnes Carlsson. The single reached number one on the Oricon Singles Chart and was certified Gold by the Recording Industry Association of Japan.

Single information
"We Can Make It!" was used as the theme song for the television series Bambino! starring Arashi member Jun Matsumoto, making the single the Third consecutive single for a television series starring Matsumoto (the first being "Wish"). "We Can Make It" is a cover of "Love Is All Around" by Swedish singer Agnes Carlsson. It features the same melody, but with different lyrics and a rap part. The B-side "Di-Li-Li" was used as the campaign song for House Foods' "C1000 Lemon Water" commercial.

"We Can Make It!" was released in two editions: a regular edition containing the karaoke versions of the songs released in the single, and a limited edition containing a bonus track and a set of cards enclosed in a clear plastic sleeve that served as the cover art.

Track listing
All track arrangements done by Suzuki Masaya, except where noted.

Charts and certifications

Charts

Certifications

Release history

References

External links
 Product information 

2007 singles
2007 songs
Arashi songs
J Storm singles
Japanese television drama theme songs
Oricon Weekly number-one singles
Songs written by Sho Sakurai
Songs written by Anders Wikström (songwriter)
Songs written by Fredrik Thomander